Yorkton Municipal Airport  is located  north of Yorkton, Saskatchewan, Canada.

History

During World War II the airport was operated as RCAF Station Yorkton and was home to No. 23 Elementary Flying Training School and No. 11 Service Flying Training School, both of which were part of the British Commonwealth Air Training Plan.

Current users
Among the present users is a Gliding Centre, operated for the Royal Canadian Air Cadets.

See also 
 List of airports in Saskatchewan

References

External links 

Certified airports in Saskatchewan
Airports of the British Commonwealth Air Training Plan
Orkney No. 244, Saskatchewan
Transport in Yorkton